Georges Hirsch (22 February 1895 – 12 May 1974) was a French theater director, a member of the French Resistance, and municipal councillor of Paris.

He was a director of the Paris Opera from 1946 to 1951 and from 1956 to 1959. Married to the singer Madeleine Mathieu, he is the father of Professor Jean-François Hirsch, creator of the first paediatric neurosurgery department at the Necker-Enfants Malades Hospital and of Georges-François Hirsch, also director of several Parisian theatres.

Life 
Hirsch was born in the 19th arrondissement of Paris in 1895 A member of the SFIO, he was appointed municipal councillor of Paris and general councillor of the former Seine department from 1933 to 1940.

In this capacity, he chaired the jury of the International singing competition of Toulouse on 2 occasions.

Hirsh died in the 16th arrondissement of Paris in 1974 and was buried at Père Lachaise Cemetery (89th division).

References

External links 

1895 births
Councillors of Paris
1974 deaths
French Resistance members
Chevaliers of the Légion d'honneur
Recipients of the Resistance Medal
Antisemitism in France
Directors of the Paris Opera
Burials at Père Lachaise Cemetery